The VIFF Centre (formerly the Vancouver International Film Centre and the Vancity Theatre) is a movie theatre in Vancouver, British Columbia, Canada, which houses the 175-seat Vancity Theatre, the 41-seat Studio Theatre, as well as the offices for the Vancouver International Film Festival. Located at 1181 Seymour Street in downtown Vancouver, the theatre can accommodate seminars, live performances, film, video, and multimedia presentations.

The building, designed by Hewitt and Kwasnicky Architects, opened in September 2005 just in time for the 2005 Vancouver International Film Festival. In December of that year, the Vancity Theatre formally launched year-round repertory cinema programming. The theatre is sponsored by and named for the Vancity credit union, although prior to the complex's launch the theatre was stuck in a dispute that might have threatened the sponsorship, or even forced VIFF to refund Vancity's entire donation to the project, because it was deemed to be in conflict with the city's official naming rights policy at the time.

Renovations in 2019–20, which were completed in time for the 2020 Vancouver International Film Festival, the venue added a 41-seat Studio Theatre for smaller audience presentations, a new media lab to present new media and virtual reality projects, an education suite and a video wall in the complex's atrium.

The annual Game Design Expo, hosted by Vancouver Film School's Game Design program, takes place in the Vancity Theatre.

See also
TIFF Bell Lightbox

References

External links
 

Cinemas and movie theatres in Vancouver
Headquarters in Canada
Vancouver International Film Festival
Theatres completed in 2005
Festival venues in Canada
2005 establishments in British Columbia